The term feline tapeworm may refer to:
 Dipylidium caninum, a tapeworm often infesting domestic cats whose intermediate host is parasitic fleas
 Taenia taeniaeformis, a similar worm whose intermediate host is rodents

Animal common name disambiguation pages